Dicerandra odoratissima, commonly known as the rose balm, is a species of Dicerandra native to the Southeastern Coastal Plain, with a geographic range that extends from eastern Georgia to southern South Carolina. Kral (1982) originally suggested that this species was so distinct from the remaining members of the genus that it should be placed in a separate section or a distinct genus. Today, D. odoratissima and its close relative D. radfordiana are members of the Lecontea clade.

References

odoratissima
Flora of the Southeastern United States
Flora without expected TNC conservation status